is a train station in the city of Saku, Nagano, Japan, operated by East Japan Railway Company (JR East).

Lines
Kita-Nakagomi Station is served by the Koumi Line and is 68.4 kilometers from the terminus of the line at Kobuchizawa Station.

Station layout
The station consists of one ground-level side platform serving a single bi-directional track.  There is no station building, but only a shelter on the platform. The station is unattended.

History
It was elevated to a full station on 1 September 1934, and renamed to its present name on 1 March 1944. With the dissolution and privatization of JNR on April 1, 1987, the station came under the control of the East Japan Railway Company (JR East).

Surrounding area
Saku City Hall

See also
 List of railway stations in Japan

References

External links

 JR East station information 

Railway stations in Nagano Prefecture
Railway stations in Japan opened in 1915
Stations of East Japan Railway Company
Koumi Line
Saku, Nagano